San Lorenzo is a corregimiento in San Lorenzo District, Chiriquí Province, Panama. Its population as of 1990 was 1,621; its population as of 2000 was 1,772.

References

Corregimientos of Chiriquí Province